Richard Gray Eder (August 16, 1932 – November 21, 2014) was an American film reviewer and a drama critic.

Life and career
For 20 years, he was variously a foreign correspondent, a film reviewer and the drama critic for The New York Times. Subsequently he was book critic for the Los Angeles Times, winning a Pulitzer Prize for Criticism and the National Book Critics Circle annual citation for an entry consisting of reviews of John Updike's Roger's Version, Clarice Lispector's The Hour of the Star, and Robert Stone's Children of Light.

In the last years of his life, he wrote book reviews for The New York Times, the Los Angeles Times and The Boston Globe. On November 21, 2014, Eder died of pneumonia as a result of post-polio syndrome in Boston, Massachusetts, aged 82. He was a great-grandson of James Martin Eder.

References

External links

1932 births
2014 deaths
Pulitzer Prize for Criticism winners
American people of Russian-Jewish descent
American newspaper reporters and correspondents
American literary critics
Jewish American writers
The New York Times Pulitzer Prize winners
Deaths from pneumonia in Massachusetts
Writers from Washington, D.C.
Harvard University alumni
Deaths from polio
21st-century American Jews